Dol pod Gojko is a settlement in the Municipality of Vojnik in eastern Slovenia. The area is part of the traditional region of Styria. It is now included with the rest of the municipality in the Savinja Statistical Region.

Name
The name of the settlement was changed from Dol to Dol pod Gojko in 1953.

Church
The local church is dedicated to the Holy Trinity and belongs to the Parish of Frankolovo. It was built between 1848 and 1849 and is dominated by its double spire. Its paintings are the work of the Friulian painter Jakob Brollo (sl) (1834–1918) and its furnishings date from the time of the church's construction. The church stands on Gojka Hill in the settlement.

References

External links
Dol pod Gojko at Geopedia

Populated places in the Municipality of Vojnik